Colégio 2 de Julho, or C2J, is a private school located in Salvador, Brazil. Its courses go from pre-school to highschool, which in the Brazilian educational system is usually identified with ages from 4 to 17.

Colégio 2 de Julho was founded in 1927 as the Escola Americana or American School, in 1938 its name was finally changed to 2 de Julho. 
The school is named after the independence date of the Brazilian state of Bahia

External links
School's Website

Schools in Brazil
Organisations based in Salvador, Bahia
Educational institutions established in 1927
Education in Bahia
1927 establishments in Brazil